Aerosport may refer to:

 Aerosport Inc, company founded in 1971 to market aircraft for homebuilding
 Aerosport (air show), air show created in 1993 in Igualada, Spain
 Aerosport OY, an Estonian aircraft manufacturer, based in Keila
 Aerosport Quail
 Aerosport Rail
 Aerosport Scamp
 Aerosport Woody Pusher